Miriam Dehne  (born February 23, 1968 in Düsseldorf), is a German film director and screenwriter.

Biography and artistic development
Miriam Dehne grew up in Düsseldorf. After graduation, she moved to Berlin. She completed her design studies at the Hochschule der Künste (HdK, today UDK) under Professor Wolfgang Joop. The first Super 8 films about the scene in Berlin in the 1980s / 1990s were made during her studies. She attends the masterclasses of Mark W. Travis, Judith Weston and Keith Cunningham (among others). , her first full-length feature film, premiered at the Berlinale in 2005, is honored by the Confédération Internationale des Cinémas D’Art et Essai and receives a nomination for the Deutscher Filmpreis (German Film Prize). In addition to her work for the cinema and television, Miriam Dehne creates as the author (screenplay written together with Jackie Thomae) and director the first German web-fiction format They call us Candy Girls for which she receives the ITPV Award in 2008. The feature film Little Paris is released in cinemas in 2009, also being nominated for the Deutscher Filmpreis and has its international premiere at the 11th Shanghai International Film Festival.

Her theater play Mom's Room (Laboratory Arts Collective / Christopher Guy Showroom in Los Angeles) premiered in 2014. The music film B-Movie: Lust and Sound in West Berlin, for which she is shooting the re-enactments, has its premiere at the Berlinale (Panorama) and receives in 2015 the Defa Foundation's Heiner Carow Prize for the successful combination of fiction and documentation. In the same year Dehne is a guest lecturer for acting at the Film University Babelsberg Konrad Wolf, where she works as the guest director of the film Falling Stars. The film received two awards (2017 Wildsound Female Feedback Toronto Film Festival, Best Cinematography (Florian Baumgärtner) and 2018 GWCIFF New York, Best Narrative Short )

As an author, she writes screenplays, short stories and plays. Her shortstory Lady Luck was awarded by the Rheinsberger Autorinnenforum. In 2014, her play Mom's Room premiered in Los Angeles (Laboratory Arts Collective / Christopher Guy Showroom). Here she worked with the artist collective The Laboratory Arts Collective, which was founded by the actor and producer Nigel Daly (Screen international). Together with the Hotel Soho House Berlin Dehne founded the women and film network Women and Film Salon (2011-2017) with regular events taking place at the Berlinale. After 2017, the engagement in cooperation with the Sir Savigny Hotel named Female Film Cocktail continued as part of the Berlinale.

Dehne is a member of the Deutsche Film Akademie (German Film Academy) and Pro Quote Film. From 2013–2016, she was a jury member of the Prize for Young Cinematography by the German Film Academy and the Neue Nationalgalerie, and from 2017 to 2022 she is a jury member of the short film jury of the BKM (Federal Government Commissioner for Culture and the Media).

Filmography – selection

As director 

 2015: B-Movie: Lust & Sound in West-Berlin 1979–1989 (Regie Reenacments)
 2014: Berlin Models, Serie (75 Folgen
2018: 2018  Falkenberg Mord im Internat (Pilot/first episode)
2021: Die Sterntaler des Glücks (Herzkino, ZDF)

As director and screenwriter 

 2015: Falling Stars, short film
2013: Tears, short film
2009, 2008: They Call Us Candy Girls, webisode, MySpace, 30 episodes, screenplay written with Jackie Thomae
 2008: Little Paris, feature film, SWR
 2005: , feature film, ZDF, episode: Lizzy, episode film
 2002: 99 Euro films, feature film, episode: Loreley S., short film
 1993–2001: The Bull Never Wins, shortfilm; Vivi Kiss, shortfilm; I Love My Pony, ARTE, documentary film; Urban Style Mutation, documentary film; Cinderella’s Kleid, ARTE, shortfilm; Die Hochzeitsmacher, ARTE, documentary film, Surabaya Johnny, ARTE, staging of Brecht & documentary film; Don't Hate Me Because I'm Beautiful, ZDF-Kleines Fernsehspiel, documentary film; Barbie lebt, ARTE, documentary film; Babsi, a Name with Many Faces, ZDF-Das kleines Fernsehspiel, poetic documentary

Music video - selection

As director and screenwriter 

 2011: Irgendwo in Berlin – musical film with Rosenstolz
 2009: Whishing you Well – Stanfour
 2009: Glaub Ihnen kein Wort – Cassandra Steen
 2002: Ich und Elaine – 2raumwohnung

Theater - selection

Regie 

 2014: Mom’s Room, The Labortaryartscollectiv, Los Angeles
 2001: Pornostars mit Liebeskummer, Staatstheater Hannover

Publications – selection 

 Angel of Germany. Lyrics, mit Inga Humpe. 2Raumwohnung, 2009.
 Du Bewegst Dich Richtig, 2Raumwohnung, 2007.
 A Dress from L.A, one of many stories about the designers Stefan Loy and Frank Ford / HEKMAG magazine, Berlin.
 Der Kaiser ist in der Gardrobe, fictional interview on the fashion industry and ecology, HEKMAG magazine, Berlin.
 Naomis Dress, diary of a German actress in Hollywood, theme: fashion and glamour, HEKMAG magazine, Berlin.
 Mom’s Room, English language play inspired by images of Marylin Minter, sleek magazine, Berlin.
 Diamond Daliah, short story about love and the decline of the art market, HEKMAG magazine, Berlin.
 Lady Luck, short story from the series ”Trip to Vegas”, Author’s Forum Rheinsberg, Rheinsberg.

Nominations and awards 
B-Movie: Lust & Sound in West-Berlin 1979–1989

 2015 World Premiere at Berlinale Panorama
 DEFA Foundation Heiner Carow Preis

Little Paris

 2008: nomination 22. Internationales Filmfest Braunschweig:
 KINEMA French-German Youth Award
 2008: Nomination 19. Filmkunstfest Mecklenburg-Vorpommern:
 Film/Main award des Landes Mecklenburg-Vorpommern
 Yound talent award: Sylta Fee Wegmann
 2009: Longlist Deutscher Filmpreis:
 Best Performance by an Actress in a Supporting Role: Nina-Friederike Gnädig
 Best Original Soundtrack: Marco Meister, Kriton Klingler-Ioannides

They call us Candy Girls

 2008: 2. IPTV AWARD at Munich Media Days
 Most innovative project

A Dress from L.A.

 2007:  "ADC – Art Directors Club" Award:
 Best editorial – Magazine article: for the article "A Dress from L.A., one of the possible storys about the designers Stefan Loy und Frank Ford"

Berlin Stories

 2005: Nomination femme totale / 10.Internationales Filmfestival Dortmund:
 International Film Competition for Female Directors
 2005: Honorable Mention Internationaler Verband der Filmkunsttheater / Confédération Internationale des Cinémas D’Art et Essai at the Berlinale
 2006: Longlist Deutscher Filmpreis:
 Best supporting actress: Julia Hummer
 Best supporting actress: Inga Busch

References

Sources
 Kino in Kürze: Little Paris. In: Der Spiegel. Nr. 52/ 2008, page 127.
 Hans Schifferle: Weltschmerz in Pink. In: Süddeutsche Zeitung. Nr. 294, page 11.
 Christina Tilmann: Das Raubtier auf der Potse. In: Der Tagesspiegel. 15. Februar 2005.
 Philip Oehmke: Zuckersüße Revolution. In: Der Spiegel. Nr. 24/2008, page 170–172.

External links
 
 Official Miriam Dehne site, German and English version
 Little Paris Website

1968 births
Living people
German women writers
German women film directors
Mass media people from Düsseldorf
Berlin University of the Arts alumni